The áo gấm (Hán-Nôm: 襖錦) is a modified áo dài made with thicker fabric, and is a traditional brocade tunic for men. It is more elaborate than the formal "áo the", a similar men's tunic. These tunics are often worn at ceremonies, birthdays, festivals and other circumstances where the women wear an expensive áo dài. The word gấm on its own means brocade (錦) hence "brocade tunic".

The elegance of the brocade tunic is proverbial, as per the Vietnamese saying áo gấm đi đêm ("a brocade tunic going in the dark"), meaning to display your wealth or talents but too late or where they cannot be seen.

References

Dresses
Vietnamese clothing
Vietnamese words and phrases
Folk costumes
History of Asian clothing